Rainer Maria is the first CD release by American indie rock band Rainer Maria. It was followed by the full-length album Past Worn Searching in 1997.

Track listing
All songs by Rainer Maria.

 Summer & Longer
 I Love You Too
 Rain Your Hand
 Portland
 Ian
 Made in Secret

References

Rainer Maria albums
1996 EPs